The Lada Kalina is a supermini car produced by the Russian manufacturer Lada (AvtoVAZ) since 18 November 2004 to July 2018. The name Kalina comes from the Russian name for a type of viburnum. It is also marketed as the Lada 117/119 in Finland.

The works on Lada Kalina started in 1993. In 1998 the projected vehicle was named "Lada-Kalina". Prototypes were presented in 1999 (hatchback), 2000 (sedan) and 2001 (combi).

First generation

Production began with a four-door sedan in 2005, a five-door hatchback being released in 2006 and a station wagon in 2007. The hot-dip galvanized steel with enhanced corrosion resistance used in the production of this car was specially developed by a number of Russian steel producers.

The first generation Kalina scored 5.6 points out of 16 in a frontal crash test conducted by the Russian ARCAP safety assessment program in 2005, and was awarded one star out of four.

The Kalina is exported to most Western European markets with a price of about €7,000–8,000. It offers driver and passenger airbags, ABS, electric power steering, air conditioning and rear seats that can be folded so that a horizontal platform is formed.

There are three inline-four gasoline engine options, ranging from 81 to 98 hp (60 to 72 kW): a 1.4-litre 16-valve (91 hp; 67 kW), a 1.6-litre 8-valve (81 hp; 60 kW) and a 1.6-litre 16-valve (98 hp; 72 kW).

Its trade name is Kalina in most countries, but in Finland, where kalina means rattle or clatter, the car is marketed as the Lada 119. Its main competitors are cars like the Dacia Logan and Hyundai Accent.

A sportier version, the Kalina GS Sport, is also produced and there has been a Super 1600 version, revealed as a concept car, that uses a turbocharged 1.6 petrol engine derived from the naturally aspirated standard models.

A Lada Kalina was used as the "Reasonably-Priced Car" in the Top Gear Russia television series. It was the fourth most popular car in Russia in 2009, debuting with 60,746 sales nationally, and ranked first in 2012.

Lada El Lada 
The electric car Lada El Lada was introduced in 2011. This was a Lada Kalina station wagon with the 30 kW electric motor powered by the 23 kWh battery pack. Only 100 electric Ladas were produced.

Second generation

The second generation of the car was revealed at the 2012 Moscow International Automobile Salon. It is basically a facelifted first generation, albeit with a slightly extended wheelbase and length, 13- or 14-inch wheel discs, electronic throttle control and now produced only in hatchback and wagon form. All interior controls are now in English only, just like in the recently introduced Lux models of the Lada Granta. The Kalina was used as the basis for the Japanese Datsun mi-DO, which is produced specifically for the Russian market.

The hatchback entered production in May 2013, followed by the station wagon later in September. A sport version was also available in the Russian market.

Lada Kalina Cross wagon debuted in 2014. The car differs with increased 20 mm road clearance, the altered gear ratios in transmission and the plastic body kit.

References

External links
Official Lada website (including all Kalina models)

2010s cars
Kalina
Subcompact cars
ARCAP superminis
Cars introduced in 2004
Cars of Russia